Roberto Santilli (born 22 February 1965) is an Italian professional volleyball coach and former player.

Career as coach
In 2007, Santilli moved to Jastrzębski Węgiel and coached his team to the 2008–09 PlusLiga bronze medal, and a silver one next season. Also, in 2010 they won the Polish Cup after beating Asseco Resovia. 

In 2010, he left PlusLiga and joined the Russian team, Iskra Odintsovo.

Santilli was an assistant coach of Vital Heynen in the German national team, that won a bronze medal at the 2014 World Championship held in Poland. In 2015, he was named a new head coach of the Australian national volleyball team.

On 11 April 2017, he was appointed new head coach of the Polish team, Indykpol AZS Olsztyn.

For the 2020–21 season, Santilli became the first ever foreign head coach in the South Korean Volleyball League, by joining Incheon Korean Air Jumbos.

Honours

Clubs
 CEV Challenge Cup
  2008/2009 – with Jastrzębski Węgiel

 National championships
 2009/2010  Polish Cup, with Jastrzębski Węgiel
 2020/2021  South Korean Championship, with Incheon Korean Air Jumbos
 2021/2022  Turkish SuperCup, with Ziraat Bankası Ankara

Youth national team
 2002  CEV U20 European Championship, with Italy U21

References

External links

 
 Coach profile at LegaVolley.it 
 Coach profile at Volleybox.net

1965 births
Living people
Sportspeople from Rome
Italian men's volleyball players
Italian volleyball coaches
Volleyball coaches of international teams
Italian expatriate sportspeople in Poland
Italian expatriate sportspeople in Russia
Italian expatriate sportspeople in Germany
Italian expatriate sportspeople in Australia
Italian expatriate sportspeople in Turkey
Jastrzębski Węgiel coaches
MKS Będzin coaches
AZS Olsztyn coaches
Projekt Warsaw coaches